Paul Foley (12 March 1914 – October 1983) was an American business executive. He was President & CEO, Interpublic Group of Companies (IPG) and is inducted into the AAF Advertising Hall of Fame.

Foley was a creative director at McManus, John & Adams, then president of McCann-Erickson before his role at IPG.

Campaigns in which he was involved included Pontiac, Buick, Coca-Cola, Exxon, Nabisco, Del Monte, Nestle.

External links
Paul Foley via AAF Hall of Fame

1914 births
1983 deaths
American marketing people
20th-century American businesspeople